Camptown Football Club is a Guyanese football club based in Georgetown, Guyana that competes in the GFF National Super League, the top tier of Guyanese football. During the 2010 season, Camptown finished in fifth place.

References 

Football clubs in Guyana